This is a list of people elected Fellow of the Royal Society in 1944.

Fellows 

Ralph Alger Bagnold
Ronald Percy Bell
Hendrik Johannes van der Bijl
Stanley Melbourne Bruce, Viscount Bruce of Melbourne
Cecil Reginald Burch
Subrahmanyan Chandrasekhar
Sir George Edward Raven Deacon
Sir Jack Cecil Drummond
Alexander Thomas Glenny
Sir Ronald George Hatton
Robert Downs Haworth
William Ogilvy Kermack
Franklin Kidd
Guy Frederic Marrian
Bryan Austin McSwiney
Michael Polanyi
Alec Sand
Sir William Arthur Stanier
Sir Cyril James Stubblefield
Oscar Werner Tiegs
John Henry Constantine Whitehead

Foreign members 
Oswald Theodore Avery
Maurice Lugeon
Theodor Svedburg
Nils Eberhard Svedelius
Stephen Prokofievitch Timoshenko

1944
1944 in science
1944 in the United Kingdom